Islambouli is an Arabic toponymic surname (nisba) signifying an association with Istanbul. It may refer to:

 Khalid Islambouli (1955–1982), Egyptian army officer who planned and participated in the assassination of Egyptian president Anwar Sadat in 1981
 Showqi Al-Islambouli, Egyptian Islamist, younger brother of Khalid, who attempted to assassinate Egyptian President Hosni Mubarak in 1995 

Arabic-language surnames
Toponymic surnames
Nisbas
People from Istanbul